Daddy is a 2001 Telugu-language family drama film directed by Suresh Krissna. It stars Chiranjeevi, Simran and Ashima Bhalla, with music composed by S. A. Rajkumar. The film was produced by Allu Aravind under the Geetha Arts banner. The film was dubbed into Tamil and Hindi as Dance Master and Meri Izzat in 2003 and 2008 respectively.

Plot
Raj Kumar or Raj (Chiranjeevi) is a rich audio company owner who owns a modern dance school. Dance is his passion and his life until he meets and marries Shanti (Simran). They have a daughter Akshaya (Anushka Malhotra). Raj believes in his friends and does anything for them. However, they take advantage of him and usurp his wealth. Though Raj and his family are happy in their not-so-lavish lifestyle, their happiness is shattered when Akshaya becomes ill with a heart condition. Raj, instead of bringing the money Shanti had stored in the bank to the hospital to save Akshaya, uses it to save his former dance student Gopi (Allu Arjun), who was hit by a car. Shanti, who is pregnant, leaves him because she feels that he killed their daughter.

Six years later, Raj, who is once again wealthy, sees his second child, Aishwarya, who looks exactly like his Akshaya, in whose honor he builds a foundation which takes care of poor, unhealthy children and their families. He builds a relationship with Aishwarya without Shanti's knowledge. However, Shanti finds out, tries to reconcile with him after realizing her mistake, but doesn't because she sees him with the same friend who took advantage of them earlier. Raj agrees to leave, says a final goodbye, and as he is about to leave, sees his child caught in an accidental fire at her school function. He saves her, but he is wounded. Shanti sees how much he loves her and Aishwarya, and they finally reunite.

Cast
 Chiranjeevi as Raj Kumar
 Simran as Shanti
 Anushka Malhotra as Akshaya / "Aish" Aishwarya
 Ashima Bhalla as Priya
 Rajendra Prasad as Prasad
 Sarath Babu as doctor
 Kota Srinivasa Rao as Shanti's paternal uncle
 Allu Arjun as Gopi Krishna (in a cameo appearance)
 Achyuth as Ramesh
 M. S. Narayana as Priya's father
 Uttej as Priya's friend

Soundtrack

The audio was released on 14 September 2001. The fans of Chiranjeevi all over the state organized the audio release of the film and they selected the district headquarters as the venues and invited the top-rank government officials and politicians. Music was composed by S. A. Rajkumar and the lyrics were provided by Chandrabose, Sirivennela Sitarama Sastry, Bhuvanachandra and Srinivas. The songs were received well by the audience.

Box office

Daddy completed 50 days in 97 centres and 100 days in 15 centres. It was dubbed in Hindi as Meri Izzat and in Tamil as Dance Master .

Awards
Nandi Award for Best Art Director - K. Ashok

References

External links
 
 Movie review at idlebrain.com

2001 films
2000s Telugu-language films
Indian drama films
Films directed by Suresh Krissna
Films scored by S. A. Rajkumar
Geetha Arts films
2001 drama films